The Glass Tower is a 1957 West German drama film directed by Harald Braun and starring Lilli Palmer, O.E. Hasse and Peter van Eyck. It was made by Bavaria Film at their studios in Munich. The film's sets were designed by the art director Walter Haag. Palmer plays the role of an adulterous socialite.

Cast
 Lilli Palmer as Katja Fleming
 O.E. Hasse as Robert Fleming
 Peter van Eyck as John Lawrence
 Brigitte Horney as Dr. Bruning
 Hannes Messemer as Dr. Krell
 Ludwig Linkmann as Blume
 Gerd Brüdern as Prosecutor
 Fritz Hinz-Fabricius as Gerichts-Präsident
 Else Ehser as Mrs. Wiedecke
 Werner Stock as Wendland
 Ewald Wenck as Policeman
 Gaby Fehling as Sister Margarethe

References

Bibliography 
 Bock, Hans-Michael & Bergfelder, Tim. The Concise CineGraph. Encyclopedia of German Cinema. Berghahn Books, 2009.

External links 
 

1957 films
West German films
German drama films
1957 drama films
1950s German-language films
Films directed by Harald Braun
Adultery in films
Bavaria Film films
Films shot at Bavaria Studios
1950s German films